Jim Cole (born October 26, 1952) is a former American football player and coach. He served as the head football coach at Alma College in Alma, Michigan from 1991 to 2011, compiling a record of 114–90.

Playing career
Cole played quarterback at the Alma College in Alma, Michigan.  He was named all-conference and all-district quarterback for the Scots.

Coaching career

Assistant coaching
Cole was a graduate assistant at Central Michigan University during the Chippewas' national championship season in 1974.  He also spent time coaching as an assistant at Alma and as a head coach in the high school ranks.

Alma
Cole was the head football coach for Alma He assumed the role in 1991 after working as an assistant coach for eight years under Phil Brooks.  Cole's coaching record at Alma was 114–90.

Cole has also coached the women's track teams at Alma.  His teams have won or shared seven straight MIAA titles from 1985 to 1991.

Head coaching record

College

References

1952 births
Living people
American football quarterbacks
Alma Scots football coaches
Alma Scots football players
Central Michigan Chippewas football coaches
College track and field coaches in the United States